Parablennius verryckeni is a species of combtooth blenny found in the eastern Atlantic ocean from Congo to Sierra Leone.  This species reaches a length of  TL. The specific name honours the radio and telegraph operator and sports fisherman C. Verrycken of Banana Creek in the  Democratic Republic of the Congo Poll said collected “many interesting specimens” for him.

References

verryckeni
Fish described in 1959
Taxa named by Max Poll
Fish of the Atlantic Ocean
Fish of Africa